Robert Franklin Palmer Jr. (June 19, 1945 – November 20, 1997) was an American writer, musicologist, clarinetist, saxophonist, and blues producer. He is best known for his books, including Deep Blues; his music journalism for The New York Times and Rolling Stone magazine; his work producing blues recordings and the soundtrack of the film Deep Blues; and playing clarinet in the 1960s band the Insect Trust.  A collection of his writings, Blues & Chaos: The Music Writing of Robert Palmer which was edited by Anthony DeCurtis, was published by Simon & Schuster on November 10, 2009.

Early career
Palmer was born in Little Rock, Arkansas, the son of a musician and school teacher, Robert Palmer Sr. A civil rights and peace activist with the Student Nonviolent Coordinating Committee in the 1960s, the younger Palmer graduated from Little Rock University (later called the University of Arkansas at Little Rock) in 1964. Soon afterwards he and fellow musicians Nancy Jeffries, Bill Barth, and Luke Faust formed a psychedelic music group, the Insect Trust playing songs blending jazz, folk, and blues with rock and roll. The band recorded its first, self-titled album on Capitol Records in 1968. Palmer continued playing clarinet and saxophone from time to time in local bands in areas where he lived throughout the rest of his life.

Later period
In the early 1970s, Palmer became a contributing editor of Rolling Stone. He became the first full-time rock writer for The New York Times a few years later, serving as chief pop music critic at the newspaper from 1976 to 1988.  According to National Public Radio, Palmer was also the New York Ti'es "first full-time rock writer".  

He continued to work as a journalist for film magazines and Rolling Stone; meanwhile, he began teaching courses in ethnomusicology and American music at colleges, including at the University of Mississippi. In the early 1990s, he also began producing blues albums for Fat Possum Records artists, like R. L. Burnside and Junior Kimbrough.  After living near Memphis from 1988 through 1992, he spent about six months at a country estate near Little Rock before relocating in early 1993 to New Orleans which was his home until his death.

Two of his better-known books are the historical study Deep Blues (1982) and Rock & Roll: An Unruly History (1995), the latter of which was the companion book to the ten-part BBC and PBS television documentary series Rock & Roll (aka Dancing in the Street) on which he served as chief consultant.

In 1985, he was recruited to play clarinet by friends Keith Richards and Ronnie Wood on the song "Silver and Gold" by U2's Bono for the Artists United Against Apartheid album Sun City.

Throughout his life, Palmer published scholarly liner notes for albums by dozens of top jazz, blues, rock and roll and world music artists, including Sam Rivers, Charles Mingus, Miles Davis, Yoko Ono, John Lee Hooker, Albert King, Bo Diddley, Ray Charles, Ornette Coleman, the Master Musicians of Jajouka, La Monte Young, and many more.

He worked as screenwriter, narrator, and music director of two documentary films
 The World According to John Coltrane (which he also directed, with Toby Byron) and Deep Blues (based on his book by the same name), He wrote a book about Jerry Lee Lewis, entitled Jerry Lee Lewis Rocks. He was heavily involved in the 1995 WGBH/BBC co-production Rock & Roll, broadcast in the United States in late 1995 on PBS but never released for general sale.

Palmer died from liver disease at the Westchester County Medical Center in Valhalla, New York, on November 20, 1997.

His daughter Augusta Palmer directed a documentary called The Hand of Fatima (2009)  about Palmer's lifelong relationship with the Master Musicians of Jajouka led by Bachir Attar

References

Sources
 Dougan, John. [ "Insect Trust biography."]. Allmusic. Accessed Dec. 9, 2004.
 Wertheimer, Linda (November 20, 1997). "All Things Considered: Robert Palmer" (audio). NPR. Accessed Dec. 9, 2004.
 
 
 Robert Palmer collection at Tulane University. Includes digitized photographs collection.

1945 births
1997 deaths
American music journalists
American male saxophonists
Record producers from New York (state)
American male screenwriters
American music critics
Writers from Little Rock, Arkansas
Blues historians
People from Valhalla, New York
20th-century American historians
20th-century American saxophonists
20th-century American male writers
American male non-fiction writers
Screenwriters from Arkansas
Screenwriters from New York (state)
20th-century American male musicians
Musicians from Little Rock, Arkansas
20th-century American screenwriters
Deaths from liver disease
Tav Falco's Panther Burns members